Gabi Reha (born 22 October 1964) is a German swimmer. She competed in three events at the 1988 Summer Olympics representing West Germany.

References

1964 births
Living people
German female swimmers
Olympic swimmers of West Germany
Swimmers at the 1988 Summer Olympics
Sportspeople from Karlsruhe